Jean Anouilh's play Antigone  is a tragedy inspired by Greek mythology and the play of the same name by Sophocles. In English, it is often distinguished from its antecedent through its pronunciation (approximately an-tee-gon).

Performance history

Original production

The play was first performed in Paris at the Théâtre de l'Atelier on February 6, 1944, during the Nazi occupation. Produced under Nazi censorship, the play is purposefully ambiguous with regard to the rejection of authority (represented by Antigone) and the acceptance of it (represented by Creon).  The parallels to the French Resistance and the Nazi occupation are clear, however. The original cast included Monelle Valentin (Antigone), Jean Davy (Créon), Suzanne Flon (Ismène), and André Le Gall (Hémon); the staging, decor and costumes were by André Barsacq.

British première

The play received its British première by the Old Vic Theatre Company at the New Theatre, London, on 10 February 1949. The production was produced by Laurence Olivier (who also played the role of Chorus) and had the following cast:

Chorus - Laurence Olivier
Antigone - Vivien Leigh
Nurse - Eileen Beldon
Ismene - Meg Maxwell
Haemon - Dan Cunningham
Creon - George Relph
First Guard (Jonas) - Thomas Heathcote
Second Guard (a Corporal) - Hugh Stewart
Third Guard - George Cooper
Messenger - Terence Morgan
Page - Michael Redington
Eurydice - Helen Beck

Adaptations

Actress Katharine Cornell produced and starred in a 1946 production at the National Theatre in Washington, D.C.  Sir Cedric Hardwicke played the role of King Creon. Also performing were Bertha Belmore, Wesley Addy, Ruth Matteson, George Mathews, and Oliver Cliff, and Marlon Brando (as the Messenger), Michael Higgins (The Third Guard). The production was staged by Cornell's husband Guthrie McClintic. The translation was by Lewis Galantière. It has since been published many times. In 1959, it was staged at the East 74th Street Theater in Manhattan, New York City.

There was an English-language television production for the BBC in 1959 starring Dorothy Tutin.

In 1974, an American television production of the play, presented on PBS' Great Performances, starred Geneviève Bujold and Stacy Keach.

There have also been more recent English translations by Barbara Bray in 2009 and by Jeremy Sams in 2002.

References

External links

1944 plays
Contemporary philosophical literature
Plays by Jean Anouilh
Plays based on Antigone (Sophocles play)
Plays set in ancient Greece